Mannibalector is the 8th studio album by American rapper Brotha Lynch Hung. It was released on February 5, 2013, by Strange Music. It serves as the third and final installment of this "Coathanga Strangla" trilogy, following these albums; including Dinner and a Movie (2010) and Coathanga Strangla (2011).  It would be his last full-length album for Strange Music, as he left the label in 2015. The album features guest appearances from Wrekonize, Bernz, Yelawolf, COS, Irv Da Phenom, Trizz, Bleezo, G-Macc, Tech N9ne and Hopsin.

Background
Brotha Lynch Hung has been working with a record producer Seven for “over a year” producing his new album, called Mannibalector. Seven said, “Lynch’s mind works differently”, his way of “constructing songs” is different than others. Also that Hung will “have the whole album structure: song titles and everything before we’ve made any of the songs. It’s interesting and different to get to work that way with an artist”. Another aspect that was difficult for Hung was to find features that fit into the storyline. Hung picked Yelawolf and Hopsin as they “fit in with their perspective that they had to follow through on”.  Hung never rejected a beat from Seven “because everything just matched”

Lyrics and production
In an interview with Strange Music, Hung said his “lyrical ability was limited because I had to more so tell stories than mostly worry about lyrics”. The album is about an era of his life that's been ended. With Fearnet, Hung discusses about how the character within the album became this serial killer. Hung said “he's lost and friendless at that point, and like I said a lot of that comes from my own life, when I've let a lot of people go and went my way alone”, adding to that Hung “used Mannibalector to get out some of those feelings” from his past.

Reception

Critical response

Mannibalector received generally positive reviews from music critics. In a positive review AllMusic's David Jeffries writes "Hung is a craftsman, kicking off this horror movie on wax with a TV news report that gives up the back-story and then goes full Hollywood, joining skits, numerous sound effects, and a relentless, blockbuster pace, all making this an album worth avoiding if it's dark." Roman Cooper of HipHopDX noted "Make no mistake, BLH’s emceeing arsenal is still quite impressive. Whether it’s the rapid-fire flows over the frenetic and disturbing strings of “Krocadil” or steady delivery over extremely minimalist production on “MDK,” Lynch is unquestionably adept at his craft."

Commercial performance
Mannibalector debuted at number 67 on the US Billboard 200, at number 8 on the Top Rap Albums and at number 13 on the Top Independent Albums charts, with first-week sales of 8,000 copies in the United States.

Track listing 

Notes
 Track listing and credits from album booklet.
 "Newsflash" features additional vocals by Seven, Robert Rebeck, Chandra Rebeck, Andrew Ross and Neil Simpson.
 "Bacon N Eggs" features additional vocals by Trizz and Lauren Brinson.
 "Fucced Up" features additional vocals by Dave Weiner.
 "Something About Susan" features additional vocals by Tallcann G.
 "The River" features additional vocals by Don Rob and Robert Rebeck.
 "Mask and Knife" features additional vocals by Alex Glass.
 "Instruments" features additional vocals by G-Smooth.
 "Body On the Floor" features additional vocals by Seven.
 "Have You Checked the Children?" features additional vocals by Lauren Brinson.
 "Sweeney Todd" features additional vocals by Lauren Brinson.
 "Dead Bitch" features additional vocals by Travis O'Guin.

Courtesy
 Yelawolf appears courtesy of Shady/DGC/Interscope Records.

Personnel 
Credits for Mannibalector adapted from the album liner notes.

 Richie Abbott – publicity
 Axis – producer
 Tom Baker – mastering
 Aaron Bean – marketing & promotions, street marketing
 Bernz – featured artist
 Bleezo – featured artist
 Brent Bradley – internet marketing
 Lauren Brinson – additional vocals
 Brotha Lynch Hung – primary artist
 Violet Brown – production assistant
 Valdora Case – production assistant
 Jared Coop – merchandising
 COS – featured artist
 Glenda Cowan – production assistant
 Penny Ervin – merchandising
 Braxton Flemming – merchandising
 Evan "NonStop" Fountaine – producer
 G Macc – featured artist
 G-Smooth – additional vocals
 Alex Glass – additional vocals
 Ben Grossi – project consultant, general management
 Mary Harris – merchandising
 Hopsin – featured artist
 Irv da Phenom – featured artist
 Robert Lieberman – legal
 Ryan Lindberg – internet marketing
 Liquid 9 – art direction & design
 Korey Lloyd – production assistant, project management, publicity coordinator
 James Meierotto – photography
 Brett Morrow – internet marketing
 Jeff Nelson – internet marketing
 Cory Nielsen – production assistant
 Jose Ramirez – street marketing
 Chandra Rebeck – additional vocals
 Robert Rebeck – mixing, producer, additional vocals
 Don Rob – additional vocals
 Chris Rooney – internet marketing
 Andrew Ross – additional vocals
 Victor Sandoval – internet marketing
 Brian Shafton – project consultant, general management
 Neil Simpson – additional vocals
 Michael "Seven" Summers – A&R, producer, additional vocals
 Tallcann G – additional vocals
 Tech N9ne – featured artist
 Dawn O'Guin – production assistant
 Travis O'Guin – executive producer, A&R, additional vocals
 Trizz – featured artist
 Dave Weiner – A&R, associate producer, additional vocals
 Wrekonize – featured artist
 Yelawolf – featured artist

References

Brotha Lynch Hung albums
2013 albums
Albums produced by Seven (record producer)
Strange Music albums
Rap operas
Concept albums